"Chasing" is a song written by Irish singer-songwriter Gemma Hayes and is the first single release from her fifth studio album Bones+Longing.

Background and release
The song was revealed as the first single release in September 2014. It was released to fans for free who supported her Pledge Music campaign on 9 October 2014 and became available in the iTunes Store in Ireland, UK, US & Canada as part of the albums pre-orders. On 9 October 2014 the full version of the single appeared on Beat's website. On 14 November 2014 a remixed version of the song was revealed through Clash Magazine.

The single was made available on 9 October 2014 in Ireland and it will be released worldwide on 15 December 2014.

Music video
No music video has been made for this single.

References

Gemma Hayes songs
2014 singles
2014 songs
Songs written by Gemma Hayes